Visavadar is a town and a municipality in Junagadh district in the Indian state of Gujarat.

Geography
It has an average elevation of 91 metres (298 feet).

Demographics
 India census, Visavadar had a population of 18,048. Males constitute 51% of the population and females 49%. Visavadar has an average literacy rate of 71%, higher than the national average of 59.5%: male literacy is 77%, and female literacy is 65%. In Visavadar, 12% of the population is under 6 years of age.

The former Chief Minister of Gujarat and the founder of Gujarat Parivartan Party, Keshubhai Patel fought 2012 state assembly election from Visavadar Constituency.

Former Visavadar MLA was Harshadbhai ribadiya, elected in assembly election 2013.

Visavadar is Taluka (Tahesil) Place.
visavadar is situated on bank of river popatdi

Holy places 

Satadhar is a holy place dedicated to  Aapa Giga, the famous Saint of Visavadar.

Tulsishyam (Famous for 'Garam Pani no Zaro' (Hot Springs)) is situated near Visavadar.

Kankai (gir) located in mid of Jungle is only 32 km away from Visavadar.

Mauni Ashram is another holy place near Visavadar to visit.

Education 

Visavadar is blessed to have no. of schools for primary education to choose from. 
You can select from Government Primary School to private ones like Shree V. D. Patel Saikshanik Sankul Mandavad, Navyug Vidyalaya, Vivekanand Primary School, Nobel School, Bharmal School, Vishvambhari Vidhya Sankul.

Here Boys and Girls study in separate high school, enough though. 
Girls can study in N.C. Parmar Girls High School, 
Boys have more alternatives, e.g. Middle School, NAGAR PANCHAYAT HIGH SCHOOL (MUNICIPAL CORPORATION), Swaminarayan Gurukul.

The only college in Visavadar is Devmani Arts and Commerce College.
There is a public library in Visavadar.

The fort of Bava Wala was in Visavadar.

Visavadar is the gateway to Sasan Gir Forest, known for Great Asiatic Lions.

References 

Cities and towns in Junagadh district